The Venture One diving accident occurred on 10 May 1977, three miles east of the North Cormorant oil field in the North Sea, when a diver drowned while working at a depth of about .

Background 
International Underwater Contractors (IUC) diving supervisor Richard Pettit had been asked to inspect the Permanent Guide Base to verify that it was clear of any obstructions that might prevent the installation of the BOP.

At approximately 0400, Pettit launched the bell with divers Dave Hammond, 29, and Craig Hoffman, 22, inside. Described as a “very competent diver,” Hoffman was from the state of Delaware and had worked for IUC in America before coming to the North Sea. Hammond was from Dundee, Scotland and had about nine years diving experience, three of which were in oilfield work.

At , supervisor Pettit stopped the bell, and for the next 90 minutes the two divers inspected the guide base from the portholes. Pettit had been told by the oil company representative that he would not find any remnant wires sticking out of the posts of the guide base, but Hoffman and Hammond reported that three of the guideposts had wire rope sticking out of, and draping over, their tops. These wires had to be cleared before the BOP could be sent down. At 0612, the divers opened the blow-down valve and pressurized the bell. When Hoffman exited the bell he was wearing a hot-water suit while Hammond was dressed in a dry suit. Hoffman swam to the guide base 15 to 20 feet away, and, while holding onto one of the guideposts, noticed that it was not hinged, which meant that the wires had to be cut away. After retrieving a hacksaw from the bell, he began cutting one of the wires.

Pettit was listening to Hoffman's respirations through his communication's headset, and noticed that his breathing rate had increased. On several occasions he instructed his diver “to stop and take a rest,” which he did. About 60 minutes later Hoffman had cleared two of the guideposts when Pettit decided to bring him back to bell and send Hammond out to complete the third wire. Later, at the fatal accident inquiry, Pettit explained that he thought the job was going to take longer than expected. "So instead of trying to rush it through—keeping Craig cutting the third wire—I decided to let Dave do it; Craig could come back and rest, because a tender’s job is fairly relaxed."

Accident 

Back in the bell, Hammond exchanged places with Hoffman, donning the same gear that Hoffman had used. Hammond later testified that everything was "absolutely normal" during the exchange. Twenty minutes later Hammond exited the bell feeling “terrific.” He quickly swam to the job and began work on the final wire. In the bell, Hoffman communicated with Pettit through a headset, giving him information about the bell oxygen content and asking him to have Hammond check part of his work. Pettit later said that Hoffman's communications were "perfectly lucid."

A few minutes later, while Hammond was working on the guide base wire, Pettit suddenly heard a “strange high-pitched electrical noise” in his headset. He immediately called the bell to see if Hoffman was okay, but received no response. Hammond was nearly finished cutting the third wire when Pettit ordered him back to the bell. Hammond answered that he “had one strand of wire left to cut through”, but Pettit ordered him to return immediately. Hammond dropped his tools and began swimming back to the bell. Roughly six feet from the bell he found Hoffman floating in a “dead-man’s position” inside the trunking with his arms and legs extending down in the water. Hammond tried to push his unconscious partner inside; unable to do so, he pulled Hoffman away from the hatch, and crawled through the trunking into the bell. Sitting on one of the seats, he drew Hoffman's body part way into the bell, positioned his arms over his knees and began ventilating him, giving mouth-to-mouth resuscitation.”

Minutes later, surface-to-bell communications unexpectedly broke down. A little over a year later, Pettit said in Court that, after Hammond got back into the bell and worked on Hoffman for a while, communications began to deteriorate “and at one point it had completely disappeared and at that point I had to leave and see if we could get some help from ashore.” Pettit phoned his company office and gave General Manager Stanley Kellogg details of his predicament—that he had lost contact with the bell and “couldn’t take a chance bringing it to the surface when the doors were open.” Kellogg offered advice and after the conversation ended, notified the Department of Energy, contacted Offshore Medical Support, and began calling rescue vessels. (Comex and Vickers)

On the Venture One, Pettit managed to re-establish communications with the bell while Hammond continued resuscitating Hoffman. But after “20 or 25 minutes,” Hoffman showed no signs of life and his eye pupils were unresponsive to light. Pettit ordered Hammond to recover Hoffman's body inside the bell, but Hammond was unable to do so. When asked at the Inquiry what the problem was, he answered: “Well, he weighed almost as much as I did and plus the fact he was wearing a hot-water suit is quite a heavy piece of material, that added to his own weight and the fact that it was totally a dead weight, no help at all involved and I had a very limited space to work in, I couldn’t pull him in all the way.” Pettit asked if Hoffman was dead and Hammond said that he was. By that time Hoffman had not been breathing for 60 minutes, and with the threat of losing bell communications, Pettit asked Hammond to “drop back down into the trunking and lash Craig’s body to the outside of the bell…and they would then bring the bell to the surface.”

When the bell arrived at the surface, a diver was lowered into the water to free Hoffman's body and swim it to a recovery basket. Then the bell was brought on board and locked onto the chamber system. Inside the system, diver James McLellan received Dave Hammond in the entrance lock. McLellan said that Hammond appeared to be “very cold, very tired and very stressed.” McLellan had been on the drill floor in radio contact with Pettit coordinating activities when the accident happened. Pettit decided to put McLellan into saturation to be with Hammond after they brought the bell up.

Aftermath 
During an investigation of the accident, authorities could not come up with a scenario that would explain why Hoffman ended up in the trunking. They found no broken diving equipment or missing equipment and no part of the system appeared to have malfunctioned in any way. Tests were conducted on the Lindberg Hammer carbon dioxide scrubber and the sodasorb, with no problems found. Dave Hammond testified that he detected nothing wrong or strange about the gas quality. When it was tested, it was found to be uncorrupted. The bell electrical system was also examined for faults because Pettit suggested that the high-pitched noise he had heard might have been caused by Hoffman's communications switch going into the water. “The salt water would be going into the speakers and cause the problem in the electronics, causing this high-pitched sound,” he told the Court. However, a technician found no electrical faults, and Hammond testified that he experienced no electrical shock in the bell.

An autopsy was conducted on Hoffman, which revealed no evidence of any disease to his heart or other organs, and no evidence of electrical shock to the body. He had a one-inch vertical laceration on his forehead, which was thought to have been caused after death. A lung dissection showed that he had died by drowning. When asked to theorize how this could happen, Dr. Hendry, the autopsy doctor, testified, “This occurred because he fell head first, maskless and presumably unconscious, into the trunking of the diving bell. As there is no evidence of illness, injury, or environmental hazard, my interpretation is that his loss of consciousness was occasioned by a faint (Syncope). This could have happened, for example, if he had risen quickly to his feet from a squatting position thereby causing a fall of blood pressure. The effects of such an action would have been exaggerated if at the same time he had been over breathing or had closed his nostrils with his fingers to clear his ears.” Dr. Hendry went on to emphasize that his conclusion was “hypothetical,” and that he had “no way of knowing [if] this happened.”

References 

Commercial diving accidents
History of the petroleum industry in the United Kingdom
History of Shetland
Maritime incidents in 1977
Maritime incidents in Scotland
1977 in Scotland
Oil and gas industry in Shetland
1977 disasters in the United Kingdom